The Moline Universal Tractors, also known as the Moline Athletics, were an independent American football team that played in 1920. They played in two official APFA games. They played against the Decatur Staleys and Chicago Cardinals. They played in seven games total, and had a 2-5 record. In 2017, there was a throwback game to celebrate football history that had the Universal Tractors play the Rock Island Independents.

References

American football teams established in 1920
American football teams disestablished in 1920